The 1986–87 Nationale 1A season was the 66th season of the Nationale 1A, the top level of ice hockey in France. 10 teams participated in the league, and Mont-Blanc HC won their first league title. Viry-Châtillon Essonne Hockey was relegated to the Nationale 1B.

Regular season

External links 
Season on hockeyarchives.info

France
1986–87 in French ice hockey
Ligue Magnus seasons